Drobeta is a genus of moths of the family Noctuidae. The genus was erected by Francis Walker in 1858.

Species
 Drobeta albicauda (Hampson, 1910)
 Drobeta albirufa (Druce, 1909)
 Drobeta andrevia (Schaus, 1921)
 Drobeta atrisigna (Dognin, 1910)
 Drobeta brephus Dyar, 1914
 Drobeta bullata Schaus, 1911
 Drobeta caliginosa (Schaus, 1911)
 Drobeta carneopicta (Hampson, 1910)
 Drobeta crepuscula (Schaus, 1921)
 Drobeta delectans (Walker, 1857)
 Drobeta directa (Walker, 1858)
 Drobeta eriopica (Hampson, 1910)
 Drobeta esmeralda (Hampson, 1914)
 Drobeta esthera (Schaus, 1921)
 Drobeta exscendens Walker, 1858
 Drobeta flavidorsum (Hampson, 1914)
 Drobeta fuscosa (E. D. Jones, 1915/1914)
 Drobeta grandis (Schaus, 1911)
 Drobeta hermione (Schaus, 1914)
 Drobeta ithaca Druce, 1889
 Drobeta ligneola (Schaus, 1911)
 Drobeta medioplica (Hampson, 1918)
 Drobeta melagonia Hampson, 1910
 Drobeta melamera (Hampson, 1910)
 Drobeta mesoscota (Hampson, 1910)
 Drobeta ochriplaga (Hampson, 1910)
 Drobeta onerosa (Schaus, 1914)
 Drobeta orestes (Schaus, 1914)
 Drobeta perplexa (Schaus, 1904)
 Drobeta phaeobasis Hampson, 1910
 Drobeta poliosema (Hampson, 1914)
 Drobeta pulchra (Schaus, 1904)
 Drobeta seminigra (Hampson, 1918)
 Drobeta thacia (Schaus, 1914)
 Drobeta tiresias Druce, 1889
 Drobeta tristigma (Dyar, 1914)
 Drobeta viridans (Schaus, 1904)

References

Acontiinae